A sombrero (Spanish) is a type of wide-brimmed Mexican men's hat used to shield the face and eyes from the sun. It usually has a high pointed crown, an extra-wide brim (broad enough to cast a shadow over the head, neck and shoulders of the wearer) that is slightly upturned at the edge, and a chin strap to hold it in place.  

In Spanish, any wide-brimmed hat may be considered a sombrero.

Design 
Sombreros, like cowboy hats, were designed in response to the demands of the physical environment.  The concept of a broad-brimmed hat worn by a rider on horseback can be seen as far back as the Mongolian horsemen of the 13th century. In hot, sunny climates hats often have evolved wide brims. The exact origin of the Mexican sombrero is unknown, but it is usually accepted that the hat originated with Mestizo cowboys in Central Mexico. Although sombrero is usually taken to refer to the traditional Mexican headwear, the term sombrero predates this item of clothing, and has been applied to several differing styles of hat. Other types of hats known as sombrero can be found in South America and Spain, including the sombrero calañés, sombrero cordobés and sombrero de catite (Spain), sombrero vueltiao (Colombia).

Cultural influence 
Many early Texan cowboys adopted the Spanish and Mexican sombrero with its flat crown and wide, flat brim.

The Mexican variation of the sombrero added an even wider brim and a high, conical crown.

In the Western United States, the sombrero had a high conical or cylindrical crown with a saucer-shaped brim, highly embroidered and made of plush felt.

The galaxy Messier 104 is known as the Sombrero Galaxy due to its appearance.  Similarly, Tampa Stadium was also known as "The Big Sombrero".

See also 
 Boss of the plains
 Cap
 Chupalla
 List of headgear
 Ranch
 Sun hat
 Vaquero
 Western wear

References

External links 
 

Hats
Mexican clothing
Spanish words and phrases